Ludovico Bonito (died 1413) was a Roman Catholic cardinal.

Biography
On 1 Jun 1387, Ludovico Bonito was appointed during the papacy of Pope Urban VI as Archbishop of Palermo.
In 1395, he was transferred by Pope Boniface IX to the Archdiocese of Bar.
On Dec 1395, he was named during the papacy of Pope Boniface IX as Titular Archbishop of Thessalonica.
On 5 Sep 1399, he was appointed during the papacy of Pope Boniface IX as Archbishop (Personal Title) of Bergamo.
On 15 Nov 1400, he was transferred by Pope Boniface IX to the Archdiocese of Pisa.
On 29 Jul 1407, he was transferred by Pope Gregory XII to the Archdiocese of Taranto.
On 9 May 1408, he was created cardinal priest of Santa Maria in Trastevere by Pope Gregory XII; he kept the administration of his see until 1412.
He died in 1413.

References 

14th-century Roman Catholic archbishops in Serbia
15th-century Italian Roman Catholic archbishops
Bishops appointed by Pope Urban VI
Bishops appointed by Pope Boniface IX
Bishops appointed by Pope Gregory XII
1413 deaths